Ofir Shaham (Hebrew: אופיר שחם, born 23 November 2004) is an Israeli rhythmic gymnast. She won gold in the group All-Around at the 2022 European Championship and silver in the same category at the 2022 World Championships.

Personal life 
She began the sport at age nine, in search of a dance class she arrived at the sports hall where rhythmic gymnasts' trained. She was drawn to the combination of gymnastics, dance, apparatus, and flashy clothes, after winning an Israeli championship at age 12 she decided that she wanted to go as far as possible. Her ultimate dream is to compete at the 2024 Olympic Games, her idol is Neta Rivkin. She studied at the Moshav High School

Career 
In September 2021 auditions for the new Israeli national group began, about 30 girls from all over the country auditioned. The qualifiers were physically and mentally difficult, gymnasts were dropped out until nine gymnasts remained, and since January of this year she trains for 11 hours a day, 6 days a week at the Wingate Institute.

The team debuted at the World Cup in Athens, winning gold in 5 hoops and 3 ribbons + 2 balls. Then Baku, where they got bronze in the All-Around and 5 hoops. Pamplona (All-Around silver), Portimão (All-Around gold) and Cluj-Napoca (All-Around and 5 hoops silver).

In June she participated in the European Championships in Tel Aviv, where the group won the All-Around and got silver with 5 hoops as well as the bronze medal in the senior team category along with teammates Adar Friedmann, Amit Hedvat, Romi Paritzki, Shani Bakanov, Diana Svertsov and the individuals Daria Atamanov and Adi Asya Katz.

In September Shani took part in the World Championships in Sofia along Adar Friedmann, Romi Paritzki, Diana Svertsov and Diana Svertsov, winning two silver medals in the All-Around and the 5 hoops' final. Despite being among the favourites for a team medal, Israel couldn't take part in the competition because Atamanov broke her foot the day before the competition started and, as replacements had to be announced at least 24 hours before competition, leaving the country with only Katz as individual.

References 

2004 births
Living people
Israeli rhythmic gymnasts
Medalists at the Rhythmic Gymnastics European Championships
Medalists at the Rhythmic Gymnastics World Championships